The Under Secretary of the Navy is the second-highest ranking civilian official in the United States Department of the Navy. The Under Secretary, called the "Under" in Pentagon slang, reports to the Secretary of the Navy (SECNAV). Before the creation of the Under Secretary's office, the second-highest civilian at the Department of the Navy was the Assistant Secretary of the Navy.

The current Under Secretary of the Navy is Erik Raven.

List of Under Secretaries of the Navy, 1940–present
The following men and women have held the post:

References

U
Under Secretary